Christian Brothers College was established by the Christian Brothers in Carlisle St, Rose Bay, a suburb of Sydney, New South Wales, Australia in 1935. The college was closed down in 1966 and the site is now used as a Catholic primary school called McAuley Catholic Primary School (previously McAuley Preparatory School).

See also 
 List of Christian Brothers schools

References

External links 

Educational institutions established in 1935
Educational institutions disestablished in 1966
1966 disestablishments in Australia
Former Congregation of Christian Brothers schools in Australia
Defunct boys' schools in Australia
Defunct schools in New South Wales
1935 establishments in Australia
Rose Bay, New South Wales